Events from the year 1869 in art.

Events
 January 30 – New British magazine Vanity Fair publishes the first of a long series of colour lithographic caricatures of public figures, initially by Carlo Pellegrini, portraying Benjamin Disraeli.
 January 31 – The Société Libre des Beaux-Arts publishes its manifesto.
 July 30 – Vincent van Gogh starts his apprenticeship with the art dealers Goupil & Cie in The Hague (in which his uncle is a partner).
 December 4 – The weekly illustrated newspaper The Graphic is first published by engraver William Luson Thomas in London.

Works

 Lawrence Alma-Tadema – The Wine Shop
 Peter Nicolai Arbo – Valkyrie
 Thomas Armstrong – The Hay Field
 Frédéric Bazille – Scène d'été
 Knud Bergslien – Birkebeiners on Skis Crossing the Mountain with the Royal Child
 Albert Bierstadt
 Emigrants Crossing the Plains
 Mount Hood
 William-Adolphe Bouguereau
 The Elder Sister
 The Knitting Girl
 Jean-Baptiste Carpeaux – La Danse (sculpture for Palais Garnier, Paris)
 Albert Charles Challen – Mary Seacole
 Jean-Baptiste-Camille Corot – Femme Lisant (Metropolitan Museum of Art, New York)
 Gustave Courbet – The Cliff at Etretat after the Storm (Musée d'Orsay, Paris)
 Edgar Degas – Interior (Philadelphia Museum of Art)
 Lowes Cato Dickinson – Portrait of Goldsworthy Lowes Dickinson
 Gustave Doré – Andromeda
 Jean-Jules-Antoine Lecomte du Nouÿ – The supper of Beaucaire, 28 July 1793
 Luke Fildes – Houseless and Hungry (engraving for The Graphic)
 Atkinson Grimshaw – Autumn Glory: The Old Mill
 George P. A. Healy – Abraham Lincoln
 Jean-Jacques Henner – Woman on a Black Divan
 Daniel Huntington – Sowing the Word
 Frederick Richard Lee – Morning in the Meadows
 Frederic Leighton – Daedalus and Icarus
 Édouard Manet
 The Balcony (Musée d'Orsay, Paris)
 Beach at Boulogne-sur-Mer (Private collection)
 The Departure of the Folkestone Boat (Philadelphia Museum of Art)
 The Execution of Emperor Maximilian (Kunsthalle Mannheim)
 Moonlight over the Port of Boulogne (Musée d'Orsay, Paris)
 The Reading (Musée d'Orsay, Paris)
 Repose (Berthe Morisot) (Rhode Island School of Design Museum, Providence, Rhode Island)
 Claude Monet
 Bathers at La Grenouillère
 La Grenouillère
 The Magpie
 Albert Joseph Moore
 The Quartette
 A Venus
 Gustave Moreau – Europa and the Bull
 Mihály Munkácsy – Last Day of a Condemned Man
 Erskine Nicol – A Nip Against the Cold
 Edward Poynter – Saint George for England (mosaic for Palace of Westminster)
 Thomas Stuart Smith – The Pipe of Freedom
 Thomas Thornycroft – Statue of Richard Grosvenor, Second Marquess of Westminster (marble, Grosvenor Park, Chester, England)
 W. L. Wyllie – Dawn after a Storm

Births
 January 15 – Stanisław Wyspiański, Polish playwright, painter and designer (died 1907)
 February 7 – Xavier Martínez, Mexican-born American painter (died 1943)
 February 10 – Royal Cortissoz, American art critic (died 1948)
 March 1 – Pietro Canonica, Italian sculptor (died 1959)
 March 19 – Józef Mehoffer, Polish painter and decorative artist (died 1946)
 April 6
 Marc-Aurèle de Foy Suzor-Coté, Canadian painter and sculptor (died 1937)
 Louis Raemaekers, Dutch painter and cartoonist (died 1956)
 April 11 – Maximilian Liebenwein, Austrian painter and illustrator (died 1926)
 June 7 – Lamorna Birch, born Samuel John Birch, English painter (died 1955)
 June 21 – Zaida Ben-Yusuf, born Esther Zeghdda Ben Youseph Nathan, English-born American portrait photographer (died 1933)
 June 27 – Kate Carew, born Mary Williams, American caricaturist (died 1961)
 July 20 – Charles Pillet, French sculptor and engraver (died 1960)
 October 14 – Joseph Duveen, English art dealer (died 1939)
 October 22 – August Gaul, German sculptor (died 1922)
 November 21 – Zaida Ben-Yusuf, English-born American portrait photographer (died 1933)
 December 1 – Eligiusz Niewiadomski, Polish painter, critic and assassin (executed 1923)
 December 18 – Edward Willis Redfield, American impressionist landscape painter (died 1965)
 December 31 – Henri Matisse, French painter (died 1954)
 date unknown – William Lee Hankey, English painter and illustrator (died 1952)

Deaths
 January 8 – Paul Huet, French painter (born 1803)
 June 10 – Frederick Yeates Hurlstone, English painter (born 1800)
 July 4
 Johann Friedrich Overbeck, German painter (born 1789)
 Édouard Pingret, French painter and lithographer (born 1785)
 July 10 – Jan Wnęk, Polish carpenter and sculptor (aviation accident) (born 1828)
 August 26 – Baron Leys, Belgian painter (born 1815)
 August 8 – Roger Fenton, English photographer (born 1819)
 October 12 – François-Joseph Navez, Belgian neo-classical painter (born 1787)
 November 22 – William Hamlin, American engraver, first engraver for the state of Rhode Island (born 1772)
 December – Thomas Stuart Smith, Scottish painter (born 1815)
 December 8 – Samuel Jackson, English topographical painter, "father" of the Bristol School of painters (born 1794)
 December 29 – William Essex, English enamel-painter (born 1784)
 date unknown
 Giuseppe Bisi, Italian painter, mainly of landscapes (born 1787)
 Louis-Henri Brévière, French wood-engraver (born 1797)

 
Years of the 19th century in art
1860s in art